Adultery Italian Style is a 1966 Italian comedy film written and directed by Pasquale Festa Campanile.

Cast 
Nino Manfredi as Franco Finali
Catherine Spaak as Marta Finali
Maria Grazia Buccella as Gloria
Lino Banfi as Marco
Vittorio Caprioli as Silvio Sasselli
Akim Tamiroff as Max Portesi
Mario Pisu as Vicino
Gino Pernice as Roberto

References

External links

1966 films
Italian comedy films
Films directed by Pasquale Festa Campanile
Films scored by Armando Trovajoli
Adultery in films
1966 comedy films
1960s Italian films